Tunja is a city in Colombia.

Tunja may also refer to:
 Tunja Airport, near the city in Colombia
 Tunja Province, a province of the former country of Gran Colombia
 Tunja (river), or Tundzha, a river in Bulgaria and Turkey
 Tunja Municipality, or Tundzha, in Bulgaria

See also 
 Tunca (disambiguation) (pronounced tunja in Turkish)